Niue competed at the 2011 Pacific Games in Nouméa, New Caledonia between August 27 and September 10, 2011. As of June 28, 2011 Niue has listed 63 competitors.

Athletics

Niue has qualified 1 athletes.

Men
Michael Juni Jackson

Bodybuilding

Niue has qualified 1 athletes.

Men
Reagan Ioane

Canoeing

Niue has qualified 6 athletes.

Women
Stacey Fonga Davis
Maia Aroha Davis
Daisy Fealita Halo
Karyn Misipeka
Alana Smith
Shaundell Togiamua

Golf

Niue has qualified 5 athletes.

Men
James Douglas
Masiniholo Lagolago
Tennis Takili Talagi
Jeremy Tolitule

Women
Sonia Shermaine Kifoto

Powerlifting

Niue has qualified 3 athletes.

Men
Kurt Mahanitotonu
Joe Tefua Mahanitotonu
Daniel Nemani

Rugby Sevens

Niue has qualified a men's team.  Each team can consist of a maximum of 12 athletes.

Men
Luke Murray Gibb
Zac Makavilitogia
Uani Rhodes Talagi
Kenny Akulu
Tony Pulu
Ponifasio Dean Kapaga
Vincent Pihigia
Rudolf Ainuu
Shaun Danny Atamu
Daniel Vilikoka Camira Makaia
Leonale Bourke

Shooting

Niue has qualified 10 athletes.

Sione Togiavalu
Denis Rose Ofa
Clemencia Sioneholo
Morgan Magatogia
Isatose Jr Pope Talagi
San Juan Talagi
Tuaitama Talaiti
Upokoina Tekena Vakaafi
Clayton Viliamu
Asaaf Kulkoi Mahakitau

Table Tennis

Niue has qualified 1 athlete.

Men
Waimanu Pulu

Volleyball

Beach Volleyball

Niue has qualified a women's team.  Each team can consist of a maximum of 2 members.

Women
Meleta Talaiti
Liline Morrissey

References

Pacific Games
Nations at the 2011 Pacific Games
Niue at the Pacific Games